Dirk Braunleder (born 11 March 1957) is a German swimmer who won a bronze medal in the 4 × 100 m medley relay at the 1976 Summer Olympics. He also won a silver medal in the 4 × 100 m freestyle relay at the 1975 World Aquatics Championships.

References

1957 births
Living people
German male swimmers
Swimmers at the 1976 Summer Olympics
German male freestyle swimmers
Olympic swimmers of West Germany
Olympic bronze medalists for West Germany
Sportspeople from Aachen
World Aquatics Championships medalists in swimming
Medalists at the 1976 Summer Olympics